Swirl People is the name of a Belgian house music project formed in 1997, it was named after dancing people who look like they are swirling on the dancefloor.

Group members include producer/musician Dimitri Dewever and producer/DJ Raoul Belmans. So far the duo has released four albums (one under the Cozy Creatures moniker) and over 55 twelve inch singles on various labels. 

Dimitri Dewever is the "labrat" who engineers all the productions and remixes, Raoul Belmans is considered to be one of the finest house djs in the world and is highly respected by his peers such as Derrick Carter and Mark Farina. He was also running the labels Aroma and A Second Smell (formerly known as AJ), both focusing on funky & jazzy house music and hosted a show (Switch) on Belgian national radio Studio Brussel.

Belgian dance music groups